Nimi muutettu (2002) is an album by the Finnish rock group Absoluuttinen Nollapiste.

Track listing
 "Pyhä Nynny" (Tommi Liimatta, Aki Lääkkölä) — 4:44
 "Aurinko Kaikennäkö" (Liimatta, Lääkkölä) — 5:32
 "Eräät tulevat juosten" (Liimatta, Lääkkölä) — 4:53
 "Uin ja näin (eri tapaus kuin Foliosurmat)" (Liimatta, Lääkkölä) — 6:02
 "Ipswich" (Liimatta, Lääkkölä) — 4:36
 "Vihkikaava ja käytäntö" (Liimatta, Lääkkölä) — 5:47
 "Irene Kaktus" (Liimatta, Lääkkölä) — 4:25
 "Liukuovet (kun patsas päätetään siirtää)" (Liimatta, Lääkkölä) — 4:20
 "Pyhä Nynny II" (Liimatta, Lääkkölä) — 4:21
 "Helikopterin varjo" (Liimatta, Lääkkölä) — 3:06

Personnel

 Tommi Liimatta - vocals
 Aki Lääkkölä - guitar, keyboards
 Aake Otsala - bass guitar
 Tomi Krutsin - drums, percussion

External links
  
  Album entry at band's official website

Absoluuttinen Nollapiste albums
2002 albums